Soslan Vladimirovich Kachmazov (born 14 July 1991) is a Russian football defender. He plays for FC Alania Vladikavkaz.

Club career
The pupil of the football school of the Vladikavkaz "Spartak", in 2010, spoke for his backup team in the primaries of doubles. In 2011, he made his debut in the second division as part of the "Fayur" team from Beslan.

In the spring of 2012 he moved to the Moldavian "Olympia". The first match in the championship of Moldova was played on May 6, 2012 against Zimbru, going on to replace in the 71st minute instead of Sergei Gusakov . In just a calendar year, I played 20 matches in the national championship.

In 2013 he returned to Russia and began to speak for "Alania", in the season of 2013/14 played for a double, and then – for the main line-up. In three incomplete seasons, the player played 52 games in the second division.

In early 2016, the defender again went abroad, this time to the Armenian "Banants" . The debut match in the Armenian championship was played on March 2, 2016 against Pyunik . In just a calendar year, I played 15 matches in the national championship. With his team he won the Armenian Cup of the season 2015/16, including playing in the final match against "Mika". Also played in the matches of the Europa League against Cypriot Omonia.

After leaving Banants, he was on display in the Belarusian Naftan, but left the team because of disagreements with head coach Oleg Sidorenkov . In 2017, playing at the amateur level for "Kuban-Holding" (Pavlovskaya) became the champion of the Krasnodar Territory.

References

1991 births
Sportspeople from Vladikavkaz
Living people
Russian footballers
Association football defenders
FC Spartak Vladikavkaz players
CSF Bălți players
FC Urartu players
Russian First League players
Russian Second League players
Moldovan Super Liga players
Armenian Premier League players
Russian expatriate footballers
Expatriate footballers in Moldova
Russian expatriate sportspeople in Moldova
Expatriate footballers in Armenia
Russian expatriate sportspeople in Armenia